Pier Village is a Victorian-inspired mixed-use community located in Long Branch, New Jersey along the Atlantic Ocean. It opened in 2005.

History

The land that Pier Village now sits on was originally that of the Long Branch Pier and the Kid's World amusement park.

On June 8, 1987, at around 3 PM, a fire broke out underneath the boardwalk in an electrical and gas box at the end of the pier. The fire quickly spread throughout the pier despite efforts by the Long Branch Fire Department to save it. After the fire, only the water attractions across the street from the pier remained. In the following weeks business had slowed and the remaining portion of Kid's World closed down permanently at the end of the summer.

The owner, Pat Cicalese, planned on rebuilding the pier. However, his insurance did not cover the cost to rebuild what was destroyed and the town would not fund the project so the plans were abandoned. What was left of Kid's World remained abandoned for 17 years after the fire.

Remains of the pier were demolished in the late 1990s. The rest of Kid's World across the street met the wrecking ball in 2002. The pier, which was built in three phases included stores, apartments, condominium, and amusements. The first phase was completed in 2005 at a cost of $100 million.

In 2005, Applied Development Company, led by brothers David Barry and Michael Barry (the sons of Joseph Barry), was designated the developer of the  site by the City of Long Branch and soon began construction of Pier Village, starting with the rebuilding of the boardwalk. 322 rental apartments were built in four-story buildings on Ocean Avenue and more were added in the construction of the second phase.

Features

A public grassy area called Festival Plaza is the site of regular events, including concerts, arts & crafts fairs, outdoor movies and holiday events.

The tenants are mostly local businesses, most from Monmouth County, but there are national brands, such as Rocky Mountain Chocolate Factory, and Gold's Gym.

There are three restaurants situated on the boardwalk facing the ocean: Avenue, Sirena and McLoones. Of these, only McLoone's Pier House is free-standing.  McLoone's was the only building built from the ground up by the restaurateur and was open a year in advance of the rest of the commercial properties within the Village. The developers David Barry and Michael Barry, along with partners, opened up a members-only beach club called Le Club. Designed by London-based architect David Collins, who also designed London’s Nobu Berkeley Street restaurant and the famed Blue Bar, Le Club is a  resort featuring a modern tri-level building with a rooftop pool and sun deck offering views of the ocean and a private beach area with palm trees and cabanas.  Travel & Leisure Magazine named it one of “20 Great American Beaches" in its July, 2007 issue, and New York Magazine profiled it in its annual Summer issue.

Criticism
The primary criticism of Pier Village was that Eminent Domain was abused to secure the land for development. Many argued that the homes seized were not "blighted" as the developer claimed. Residents were removed from their homes so that new homes could be constructed, 

The New York Times reported: "Either way, the fight has become a public-relations disaster for the city as it tries to reclaim its glory days, when seven United States presidents vacationed here and New York's business barons traveled by stagecoach to fill the gambling halls. The 30 or so holdout homeowners have planted signs saying NOT For Sale in their sandy yards, and they have filled the windows of their pastel bungalows with posters declaring Eminent Domain Abuse, signed petitions, shouted at public meetings and written vitriolic letters to the local newspaper questioning the mayor's and the City Council's motives."

In 2010, the state ruled that the downtown area was not blighted, and thus could not be seized by Eminent Domain to be redeveloped.

Awards

 The Urban Land Institute (ULI) named Pier Village “Project of the Year” in 2006.
 New Jersey Governor’s Tourism Award in 2009

Expansions

New pier
In 2005, plans for a new pier were unveiled.

The new plans would include:
 A ferry terminal
 An area for fishing
 A . area for exhibitions that would include a restaurant
 A beach-side stage
 An amphitheater

Hotel addition
Bungalow is much more modern than the original Victorian-styled buildings and sits at the entrance of Pier Village at the corner of Ocean Blvd. and Laird Street.

Pier Village Phase III
Applied Development Company is seeking approvals from the City for a third and final phase at Pier Village that will consist of a 100-room hotel, 200 rental residences, 75 condominium homes,  of retail space and a new oceanfront public park.

In popular culture
In a March 2008 episode of the ABC hidden-camera show, Primetime: What Would You Do?, which has actors do abnormal things (such as get into verbal fights, rob stores, etc.), showed an actor, who was significantly overweight, sitting on a bench in Pier Village while three other actors verbally insulted her.

Developer
Pier Village is being developed by David Barry and Michael Barry, principals of Applied Development Company.  The brothers are also principals of Ironstate Development.  Other notable projects from them include:

 The W Hoboken Hotel & Residences, a new 26-story hotel offering 225 rooms and 40 condominium residences on the Hudson Riverfront in Hoboken, NJ facing mid-town Manhattan.  The hotel is scheduled to open February, 2009.
Port Liberte a 1,290-unit master-planned community in Jersey City, NJ.  804 homes have been built to date.
W Marrakech Hotel & Residences:  a future hotel in Morocco, North Africa.  The hotel will offer 150 hotel rooms and 50 whole-ownership villa units.  The property is scheduled to open in mid-2010.  W Marrakech Hotel & Residences will be a core element of the Al Maaden Resort development and will overlook an 18-hole championship golf course. 
Sitework is underway.

References

External links
 Pier Village
 The Apartments at Pier Village
 New Pier Article - Darkinthepark.com
 Fall 2006 Expansion
 Article about expansion
 Asbury Park Press: The Good Life
 NY Times article about Pier Village’s impact on Long Branch
 NY Times article about Phase II expansion
 NY Times article
 NY Post article about expansion and Le Club Beach Club
 Ironstate Development Website

Shopping malls established in 2005
Shopping malls in New Jersey
Long Branch, New Jersey
Buildings and structures in Monmouth County, New Jersey
Piers in New Jersey
Tourist attractions in Monmouth County, New Jersey
Shopping malls in the New York metropolitan area
2005 establishments in New Jersey